Vempers Sports Athletic Dramatic Club, often referred to by their acronym VSADC is a Saint Lucian football club based in Castries, competing in the Saint Lucia Gold Division, the top tier of Saint Lucian football.

Honors 
SLFA First Division
Champions: (9) 1982, 1984, 1985, 1986, 1998, 2001, 2002, 2011, 2012

SLFA President's Cup
Champions: (1) 2016

References

Castries
Vempers